Eva Marie Cassidy (February 2, 1963 – November 2, 1996) was an American singer and guitarist known for her interpretations of jazz, folk, and blues music, sung with a powerful, emotive soprano voice. In 1992, she released her first album, The Other Side, a set of duets with go-go musician Chuck Brown, followed by the 1996 live solo album titled Live at Blues Alley. Although she had been honored by the Washington Area Music Association, she was virtually unknown outside her native Washington, D.C. at the time of her death from melanoma at the age of 33 in 1996.

Two years later, Cassidy's music was brought to the attention of British audiences, when her versions of "Fields of Gold" and "Over the Rainbow" were played by Mike Harding and Terry Wogan on BBC Radio 2. Following the overwhelming response, a camcorder recording of "Over the Rainbow", taken at Blues Alley in Washington by her friend Bryan McCulley, was shown on BBC Two's Top of the Pops 2. Shortly afterwards, the compilation album Songbird climbed to the top of the UK Albums Chart, almost three years after its initial release. The chart success in the United Kingdom and Ireland led to increased recognition worldwide. Her posthumously released recordings, including three number-one albums and one number-one single in the UK, have sold more than ten million copies. Her music has also charted within the top 10 in Australia, Germany, Norway, Sweden and Switzerland.

In total, nine posthumous albums have been released. The most recent, I Can Only Be Me, a collaboration with the London Symphony Orchestra, was released in 2023 and charted at number 9 on the UK album chart.

Early life
Born on February 2, 1963, at the Washington Hospital Center in Washington, D.C., Cassidy grew up in Oxon Hill, Maryland, and later Bowie, Maryland. She was the third of four children. Her father, Hugh Cassidy, is a teacher, sculptor, musician, former army medic, and world champion powerlifter of Irish and Scottish descent, while her mother, Barbara (née Kratzer), is a German horticulturist from Bad Kreuznach. From an early age, Cassidy displayed interest in art and music. When she was nine, her father began teaching her to play the guitar, and she began to play and sing at family gatherings.

At age 11, Cassidy began singing and playing guitar in a Washington-area band called Easy Street. This band performed in a variety of styles at weddings, corporate parties, and pubs. Due to her shyness, she struggled with performing in front of strangers. While a student at Bowie High School, she sang with a local band called Stonehenge. During the summer of 1983, Cassidy sang and played guitar six days a week at the theme park Wild World. Her younger brother Dan, a fiddler, was also a member of this working band. She enrolled in art classes at Prince George's Community College but dropped out after finding them unhelpful.

Throughout the 1980s, Cassidy worked with several other bands, including the techno-pop band Characters Without Names. During this period, she also worked as a propagator at a plant nursery and as a furniture painter. In her free time, she explored other artistic expressions including painting, sculpting, and jewelry design.

Music career
In 1986, Cassidy was asked by Stonehenge guitarist and high school friend, David Lourim, to lend her voice to his music project, Method Actor. This brought her to Black Pond Studios, where she met recording engineer and bassist Chris Biondo. Biondo helped her find work as a session singer and later introduced her to Al Dale, who would become her manager. She sang back-ups for various acts, from go-go rhythm and blues band Experience Unlimited to rapper E-40. Biondo and Cassidy, who were in a romantic relationship for a time, formed the five-piece "Eva Cassidy Band" with Lenny Williams, Keith Grimes, and Raice McLeod in 1990. They began to perform frequently in the Washington area.

In 1992, Biondo played a tape of Cassidy's voice for Chuck Brown, the "Godfather of go-go". It resulted in the duet album The Other Side featuring performances of classic songs such as "Fever", "God Bless the Child," and what would later become Cassidy's signature song, "Over the Rainbow". The album was released and distributed in 1992 by Liaison Records, the label that also released Brown's go-go albums. Brown originally intended to record an additional duet with Cassidy for his next solo album, but this was postponed due to ongoing negotiations between Dale and other labels for a solo deal. Cassidy's unwillingness to narrow her stylistic focus to one genre hindered her chances of securing a deal. After talks broke down, the two decided to record their own duet album. As a duo, they performed at the Columbia Arts Festival and opened for acts like Al Green and The Neville Brothers.

In 1993, Cassidy was honored by the Washington Area Music Association with a Wammie award for the Vocalist Jazz/Traditional category. The next year she was invited to perform at the event and chose to sing "Over the Rainbow." The Washington Times review of the event called her performance "a show-stopper." She took home two Wammies that night, again for Vocalist Jazz/Traditional and also for Roots Rock/Traditional R&B. For a brief period that year, Cassidy signed a deal with Blue Note Records to pair up with pop-jazz band Pieces of a Dream to release an album and tour the country. She sang two tracks on a mainly instrumental album. It was a musically unsatisfying experience for her.

After having a potential contract with Apollo Records collapse when the label went bankrupt, Biondo and Dale decided that she should release her own live album. On January 2–3, 1996, the material for Live at Blues Alley was recorded at Blues Alley in Washington, D.C. Due to a technical glitch on the first night of recording, only the second night's recording was usable, with 12 songs released on the resulting album. (The complete set of 31 songs recorded that night was eventually released 20 years later as Nightbird in 2015.) Unhappy with the way she sounded due to a cold, she was reluctant to release the album. She eventually relented, on the condition that the studio track "Oh, Had I a Golden Thread," Cassidy's favorite song, would be included in the release, and that they start working on a follow-up studio album. Her apprehension appeared unfounded as local reviewers and the public responded positively. The Washington Post commented that "she could sing anything — folk, blues, pop, jazz, R&B, gospel — and make it sound like it was the only music that mattered." The subsequent studio album she worked on was released posthumously as Eva by Heart in 1997. In the liner notes of Eva by Heart, music critic Joel E. Siegel described Cassidy as "one of the greatest voices of her generation."

Personal life
Cassidy had a relationship with Chris Biondo, but this had ended before her cancer diagnosis.

Illness and death
In 1993, Cassidy had a malignant mole removed from her back. Three years later, during a promotional event for the Live at Blues Alley album in July 1996, Cassidy noticed an ache in her hips, which she attributed to stiffness from painting murals while perched atop a stepladder. The pain persisted and X-rays revealed a fracture. Further tests found that cancer had spread to her bones, causing the fracture, as well as to her lungs. Her doctors estimated she had three to five months to live. Cassidy opted for aggressive treatment, but her health deteriorated rapidly. 

On September 17, 1996, at a benefit concert for her at The Bayou, she made her final public appearance, closing the set with "What a Wonderful World" in front of an audience of family, friends, and fans. Additional chemotherapy was ineffective, and Cassidy died on November 2, 1996, of melanoma, at her family's home in Bowie, Maryland. In accordance with her wishes, her body was cremated and the ashes were scattered on the lake shores of St. Mary's River Watershed Park, a nature reserve near Callaway, Maryland.

Posthumous recognition
 
After Cassidy's death, local folk singer Grace Griffith introduced the Blues Alley recording to Bill Straw from her label, Blix Street Records. Straw approached the Cassidy family to put together a new album. In 1998, a compilation of tracks from Cassidy's three released recordings was assembled into the CD Songbird. This CD lingered in relative obscurity for two years until being given airplay by Terry Wogan on his wide-reaching BBC Radio 2 show Wake Up to Wogan, following recommendation by his producer Paul Walters. The album sold more than 100,000 copies in the following months. The New York Times spoke of her "silken soprano voice with a wide and seemingly effortless range, unerring pitch and a gift for phrasing that at times was heart-stoppingly eloquent."

Before Christmas of 2000, BBC's Top of the Pops 2 aired a video of Cassidy performing "Over the Rainbow", which resulted in Songbird climbing steadily up the UK charts over the next few weeks. Just as ITV's Tonight with Trevor McDonald aired a feature on Cassidy, the album topped the chart. Shot at Blues Alley by a friend with a camcorder the same night the album was recorded, the video became the most requested video ever shown on Top Of The Pops 2. Alexis Petridis in The Guardian wrote, "There's an undeniable emotional appeal in hearing an artist who you know died in obscurity singing a song about hope and a mystical world beyond everyday life".

Paul McCartney and Eric Clapton were among her new-found fans. Jazz critic Ted Gioia writes, "you might be tempted to write off the 'Cassidy sensation' ... as a response to the sad story of the singer's abbreviated life rather than as a measure of her artistry. But don't be mistaken, Cassidy was a huge talent, whose obscurity during her lifetime was almost as much a tragedy as her early death." Songbird has since achieved significant chart success in Europe. It is certified six times platinum in the UK with 1,840,000 copies sold. Although still relatively unknown in the US at that time, the album would eventually be certified gold there as well.

In May 2001, ABC's Nightline in the US broadcast a well-received short documentary about Cassidy, a labor of love from Nightline correspondent Dave Marash who was a fan of her music. Over the weekend, all five of Cassidy's albums occupied Amazon.com's best sellers list top spots. The Nightline episode has since been rebroadcast three times due to popular demand and producer Leroy Sievers has said that it is "probably the most popular Nightline ever". In December, a nine-minute segment on NPR resulted in a similar sales surge, with five of the top seven spots going to Cassidy. In Britain a rebroadcast of Tonight with Trevor McDonald bumped up sales.

Since Songbird, several other CDs with original material have been released: Time After Time (2000), Imagine (2002) and American Tune (2003). 

Cassidy's cover of Time After Time was featured on the 2003 soundtrack CD of the popular superhero television series Smallville. 

Together with word of mouth and internet fan sites, online commerce has played a big role in Cassidy's success. This point was further affirmed when in 2005, Amazon.com released a list of its top 25 best-selling musicians, which placed Cassidy in fifth position, behind the Beatles, U2, Norah Jones and Diana Krall.

In 2008, another new album, Somewhere, was released. Unlike previous albums, which consisted solely of cover songs, this release contains two original songs co-written by Cassidy. An acoustic album, Simply Eva, was released in January 2011.

In March 2023, the album I Can Only Be Me was released, which featured new orchestrations by the London Symphony Orchestra. The album debuted at number 9 on the UK Official Albums Chart. In an interview with The Independent, Cassidy's former bandmate and arranger Chris Biondo shared, "Eva had a fantasy of one day having a full orchestra back her up [...] to her, that was the greatest place you could be musically." Audio restoration technology developed by filmmaker Peter Jackson was used to strip Cassidy's voice from her original recordings, with the orchestrations being produced in 2021.

Unofficial releases

A collection of previously unreleased studio recordings from 1987 to 1991, was released in 2000 as No Boundaries. This release was not endorsed by the Cassidy family and was released under a different label. An AllMusic review of the album stated that even "a gifted vocalist like Eva Cassidy can only do so much with bad material".

In 2002, the self-titled 1988 album by the band Method Actor, which featured Cassidy, was re-released by the band's guitarist and producer David Lourim with Cassidy's name displayed prominently on the cover. The Cassidy family and Blix Street Records filed a lawsuit against Lourim, claiming that Cassidy's name was used in a misleading fashion and that Blix Street has exclusive rights to her recordings. Lourim had Cassidy's written permission to release the album, and eventually the cover was changed to look like the original LP album while already released copies were affixed with a sticker indicating that they are not solo Eva Cassidy albums.

A bootleg recording that has been in circulation is called Live at Pearl's. It was recorded at Pearl's Restaurant in Annapolis, Maryland, in 1994. Copies of the recording were circulated among friends and family after her death. Some of the songs on the recording are also on Imagine and American Tune. Another recording from the early '90s, featuring Mick Fleetwood on drums and recorded at his restaurant (named Fleetwood's) in Alexandria, Virginia,  was in the possession of writer/musician Niki Lee, the former wife of pianist Lenny Williams, 1988–1996. Lee discovered it in her garage and attempted to sell it on eBay in 2008 for 250,000 pounds (around US$491,249 at that time; ~$659,650 in 2022 terms). She asserts that she converted the dollars to pounds incorrectly and was lambasted by Cassidy fans for her mistake. 

To mark the 20th anniversary of the Blues Alley concert, Blix Street Records released Nightbird, a 32-track double CD album, in November 2015. Nightbird comprises the complete Blues Alley concert recordings, including eight previously unreleased songs, from the night of January 3, 1996. The European version of the CD package also includes a DVD including 12 video performances from the Blues Alley concert. Nightbird was also released as a four-LP vinyl package worldwide.

Legacy
In 2001, Songbird: Eva Cassidy: Her Story By Those Who Knew Her, a book on the life and work of Cassidy based on interviews with close family and associates, was released in the UK. A US edition published by Gotham Books was released in late 2003 and includes two additional chapters on her influences and success in the US. Her life story has also been adapted into a musical and also a Broadway piece for cancer benefit.

A number of filmmakers have proposed films based on Cassidy's life, and have worked with her family to greater or lesser degrees, but to date these projects have not progressed past the early development stages. In late 2007, AIR Productions acquired the rights to produce a film based on Cassidy's life, being produced by Amy Redford (daughter of actor/director Robert Redford), Irwin Shapiro and Rick Singer. In an interview a year earlier, Cassidy's parents suggested Kirsten Dunst or Emily Watson as possible actresses who could play their daughter.
However, as of 2023, no film has ever been made.

Discography

Albums
 The Other Side  (1992)
 Eva by Heart (1997)
 Songbird 
 Time After Time (2000)
 Imagine (2002)
 American Tune (2003)
 Somewhere (2008)
 Simply Eva (2011)
 Acoustic (2021)
 I Can Only Be Me (with the London Symphony Orchestra) (2023)

Live albums
 Live at Blues Alley (1996)
 Nightbird (2015)

Compilation albums
 Wonderful World (2004)
 The Best of Eva Cassidy (2012)

Reissues
 Songbird 20 (2018)

References

Notes

Books
 
 ; winner of The People's Book Prize 2011/2012

Retrospective

External links
Eva Cassidy website maintained by her cousin Laura Claire Bligh
Eva Cassidy artwork website maintained by her sisters Anette Cassidy and Margret Cassidy Robinson
[ Cassidy] at the All Music Guide
Eva Cassidy: Songbird: Her Story by Those Who Knew Her at Google Book Search
Eva Cassidy Day Job at Behnke Nurseries, Beltsville MD.

1963 births
1996 deaths
20th-century American guitarists
20th-century American singers
20th-century American women singers
American blues guitarists
American blues singers
American women guitarists
American women jazz singers
American jazz singers
American people of German descent
American people of Irish descent
American people of Scottish descent
Deaths from cancer in Maryland
Deaths from melanoma
Guitarists from Maryland
Guitarists from Washington, D.C.
People from Bowie, Maryland
Singers from Maryland
Singers from Washington, D.C.
Jazz musicians from Maryland
20th-century American women guitarists